Squadron Leader David John Hatfeild Maltby,  (10 May 1920 – 15 September 1943) was a bomber pilot in the Royal Air Force, best known for his part in the Dambusters raid. He had successfully completed over 30 operations before his death in September 1943.

Early life
Maltby was born on 10 May 1920 in Baldslow, outside Hastings, Sussex. His father, Ettrick, was a headmaster at Hydneye House School which Maltby attended for a while. His mother was Aileen Hatfeild, who was originally from Hartsdown in Kent. He then joined Marlborough College between 1934 and 1936. In 1938 he began training as a mining engineer in Treeton, South Yorkshire, but resigned at the outbreak of war. He volunteered to join the Royal Air Force (RAF) in 1939 however like thousands of others joining, he was told to wait and that he would be invited back for an assessment as soon as possible. He was eventually called up on 20 June 1940 where he was accepted for aircrew training and formally joined the RAF Reserves.

Maltby's maternal uncle was the First World War Royal Flying Corps pilot Aubrey Hatfeild MBE. His great grandfather was Brough Maltby the Archdeacon of Nottingham.

RAF career

Training
Maltby started training at the RAF receiving unit in Uxbridge on Thursday 20 June. After spending some time in the Initial training wing, he attended the Elementary Flying Training School at Ansty in Warwickshire. Here, he trained in an old training aircraft known as the "Tiger Moth". After this, he was sent to No 12 Service Flying Training School at RAF Grantham. He qualified as a pilot on 18 January 1941.

Operational career
Maltby began his operational career with No. 106 Squadron RAF in June 1941, flying the Handley Page Hampden on five operations. By the end of the month he was transferred to 97 Squadron, flying first Hampdens, then Avro Manchesters and finally Avro Lancasters. 

On May 4th 1942 whilst on a mission to Struttgart, Maltby and his crew had taken heavy fire shortly after hitting enemy coast. They were carrying a large bomb load and due to the damage they had sustained they were unable to open the bomb doors to jettison the bombs. As well as this, the landing gears could not be properly deployed as they would not lock in place. Maltby made the decision to head back to base at Woodhall Spa but was directed to land at Coningsby instead due to it being a grass runway. Sgt Harold Rouse, who was at the time a gunner on Maltby's crew recalls the incident:

All crew miraculously were unscathed after the incident. 
 
He went on to complete his tour in June 1942, and was awarded the Distinguished Flying Cross on 11 August 1942.

Maltby then spent six months commanding an Air Bomber Training Section in No. 1485 Target Towing and Gunnery Flight, before returning to active service with 97 Squadron in March 1943. He was given a new crew, most of whom had only just finished training. On 25 March 1943, he and his crew were transferred to 617 Squadron, along with Flt Lt Joe McCarthy and Flt Lt Les Munro and their crews.

Operation Chastise
Maltby flew in the No. 617 Squadron RAF Operation Chastise dams raid of 1943. He was the pilot of Avro Lancaster J-Johnny, flying as part of the first wave that attacked the Möhne Dam. The first three aircraft to attack the dam (Guy Gibson flying in G-George, Hopgood in M-Mother and Harold Brownlow Martin in P-Popsie) all missed the target. The next, A-Apple (flown by Dinghy Young) hit the dam and caused a small breach but, as this was not apparent from the air, J-Johnny also attacked, scored a hit and a large breach. Maltby then returned home and was the first Lancaster to land back at Scampton having completed the operation.

For his part in Operation Chastise, Maltby was awarded a Distinguished Service Order. He was shortly after promoted to Squadron Leader and appointed as A flight commander of No. 617 Squadron.

During Gibson's leave from June until August Maltby became the acting Commanding Officer for 617 squadron until George Holden was appointed as the new permanent replacement for Gibson.

Death
Maltby was killed a few months after the dams raid during Operation Garlic, a failed attempt at a low-level raid on the Dortmund-Ems Canal.  His Lancaster JA981 crashed into the North Sea while returning to base after the mission had been cancelled due to fog over the target. It is probable that the cause of his death was a collision with a 139 Squadron Mosquito aircraft (DZ598) piloted by Flt Lt M W Colledge and navigator Flg Off G L Marshall, who were returning from an operation to Berlin, and was on a course for Wyton, Cambridgeshire. It was northeast of Cromer when it intersected Maltby's course to Coningsby. Dave Shannon, a fellow dambuster, circled the crash site for two hours whilst waiting for rescue. Maltby's body was the only one recovered and he was buried in the churchyard of St Andrew's Church, Wickhambreaux, Kent.

Post-war

Popular Culture
In the 1955 film The Dam Busters, Maltby was played by George Baker. Baker stated in an interview that he was chosen for the part due to his physical similarity to Maltby.

The detailed story of Maltby and his crew is documented in the book Breaking the Dams: The Story of Dambuster David Maltby and His Crew written by Charles Foster.

Memorabilia

A bombsight that was used by Maltby's crew on Operation Chastise is said to have been passed initially onto Maltby's father Ettrick shortly after the dams raid. It remained at Hydneye House school until its demolition, ending up in the possession of a former pupil, who sold it at auction in 2015. It is believed to be the only original bomb sight used on the dams raid that is still remaining.

Maltby's log book is still in existence and is available for online access on the IBCC archive website.

Several other pieces of memorabilia related to Maltby have appeared in recent years, however many of these have been subject to critique and doubt over their legitimacy. In November 2019 a teddy bear named "Pinnie The Wooh", said to have flown with Maltby on every flight, was revealed to be going up for auction in Bristol later that month by an unknown seller. The Maltby family later released a statement that they were unable to provide the authenticity for this item along with others that have been rumoured to be up for sale saying they never knew of their existence, and if they had, then they never would have given it away. Others have pointed out that the bear is in remarkably good condition considering it was recovered from Maltby's body which was found in the North Sea.

References

External links
 The story of Maltby and his crew at Breaking the Dams. 
 Maltby at the Dambusters Blog.
 Maltby's pilot's flying log book at the International Bomber Command Centre Digital Archive.

1920 births
1943 deaths
Royal Air Force pilots of World War II
British World War II bomber pilots
Royal Air Force personnel killed in World War II
Aviators killed in aviation accidents or incidents
Companions of the Distinguished Service Order
Recipients of the Distinguished Flying Cross (United Kingdom)
Royal Air Force squadron leaders
Military personnel from Sussex